Gilbert Wright may refer to:
 Gilbert Wright (priest), Welsh Anglican priest
 Gilbert Scott Wright, English painter
 A. Gilbert Wright, American zoologist